Lin Rui-ching is a Taiwanese politician. Affiliated with the Democratic Progressive Party, he was a member of the Legislative Yuan between 1993 and 1999.

Lin led the Yunlin County chapter of the Democratic Progressive Party, and served as a member of the DPP's Central Executive Committee. With the support of Lin Wen-lang, Lin Rui-ching was ranked fifth on the DPP party list during the 1992 legislative election, and won a seat on the Second Legislative Yuan. He was reelected to the legislature in 1995, and served through 1999.

References

Year of birth missing (living people)
Living people
Party List Members of the Legislative Yuan
Democratic Progressive Party Members of the Legislative Yuan
Members of the 2nd Legislative Yuan
Members of the 3rd Legislative Yuan
Politicians of the Republic of China on Taiwan from Yunlin County